Tadaiķi Parish is an administrative unit of South Kurzeme Municipality, Latvia. The parish has a population of 987 (as of 1/07/2010) and covers an area of 77.6 km2.

Villages of Tadaiķi parish 
 Aistere
 Brenči
 Lieģi (Jaunlieģi)
 Šukteri
 Vārve

Parishes of Latvia
South Kurzeme Municipality
Courland